Mons Moro is a mountain on the near side of the Moon, within Mare Cognitum, and southwest of the crater Bonpland. The name of the feature was approved by the IAU in 1976, and refers to Italian geologist Anton Lazzaro Moro.

The selenographic coordinates of this peak are 11.84° S, 19.84° W. It is linear and approximately 13 km long, and it has a lower albedo than the surrounding mare.  This feature is described in Apollo Over the Moon: A View from Orbit, Figure 92:

References

External links

Mons Moro at The Moon Wiki
 LTO-76C1 Bonpland — L&PI topographic orthophotomap map.
 AS16-P-5428 and AS16-P-5433, Apollo 16 Panoramic camera frames, showing high resolution views of Mons Moro

Moro, Mons